Syahrizal Syahbuddin (born in Bireuën, Indonesia, 2 October 1993) is an Indonesian professional footballer who plays as a defender. He was the first Indonesian footballer to play in Paraguay.

Club career

Mitra Kukar
In December 2014, he joined Mitra Kukar.

Celebest
In 2017, Syahrizal signed a contract with Indonesian Liga 2 club for the 2017 season.

Aceh United
He was signed for Aceh United to play in the Liga 2 in the 2018 season.

PSPS Riau
In 2021, Syahrizal signed a contract with Indonesian Liga 2 club PSPS Riau for the 2021 season. He made his league debut on 6 October against Semen Padang at the Gelora Sriwijaya Stadium, Palembang.

International career 
He made his debut for Indonesia under-23 national team in friendly match against Singapore U-23 on 13 July 2013 with score 1-0 for Singapore.

Honours

Indonesia U-23
Southeast Asian Games Silver medal: 2013
Islamic Solidarity Games Silver medal: 2013

References

External links 
 
 Syahrizal Syahbuddin at Liga Indonesia

Living people
Acehnese people
People from Bireuën Regency
Sportspeople from Aceh
1993 births
Association football defenders
Indonesian footballers
Indonesia youth international footballers
Indonesian expatriate footballers
Expatriate footballers in Paraguay
Liga 1 (Indonesia) players
Persija Jakarta players
Southeast Asian Games silver medalists for Indonesia
Southeast Asian Games medalists in football
Competitors at the 2013 Southeast Asian Games
Atlántida Sport Club players